Babenco: Tell Me When I Die is a 2019 Brazilian documentary film directed by Bárbara Paz. The film premiered at the 2019 Venice Film Festival, where it won Best Documentary on Cinema. It focuses on the last years of life of filmmaker Hector Babenco, who died in 2016, victimized by a cancer. It was selected as the Brazilian entry for the Best International Feature Film at the 93rd Academy Awards, but it was not nominated.

Interviews

Reception

Awards 
 WINNER: Venice Film Festival Best Documentary on Cinema (Italia) 2019 
 WINNER: Bisato D'oro Independent Critic Award of Venice FIlm Festival (Italia) 2019 
 WINNER: MIFF 2020 Best Documentary (India) 2020 
 WINNER: FICVIÑA 2020 Best Latin American Documentary Feature Film (Chile) 2020 
 SPECIAL MENTION: IDF 2020 4th West Lake International Documentary Festival (China) 2020 
 WINNER: GZDOC 2020 Guangzhou International Documentary Film Festival (China) 2020 
NOMINADA:  Mejor película iberoamericana en la 63° edición de los Premios Ariel entregada por la Academia Méxicana de Artes y Ciencias Cinematográficas

See also
 List of submissions to the 93rd Academy Awards for Best International Feature Film
 List of Brazilian submissions for the Academy Award for Best International Feature Film

References

External links

2019 documentary films
2019 films
Brazilian documentary films
2010s Portuguese-language films
Documentary films about film directors and producers